Marcell Cornelius Coetzee (born 8 May 1991) is a South African rugby union player who plays for South African side the Blue Bulls. He plays as a flanker.

South Africa
Coetzee made his debut in Super Rugby for the Sharks against the Brumbies on Saturday 7 May 2011. He has offloading skills that have been likened to those of Sonny Bill Williams.

Heyneke Meyer, Springboks coach, included him in the national squad to face England in a test series where Coetzee made his Springbok test debut on 9 June 2012 in Durban.

Top League
Coetzee joined Japanese Top League side Honda Heat for the 2015–2016 season.

Ulster Rugby
In February 2016, it was announced that he would join Irish Pro12 side Ulster on a three-year deal starting in the 2016–2017 season. Coetzee featured sparingly in his first two seasons with Ulster, due to recurring knee injury problems. Coetzee was the 2020–21 joint top try-scorer (9) and the 2020–21 Pro14 Players' Player of the Season in his final season with Ulster.

Return to South Africa
In December 2020 the Bulls confirmed that Coetzee would join the franchise in June 2021 on a three-year deal.

Honours
 Currie Cup winner 2021
 Pro14 Rainbow Cup runner-up 2021
 United Rugby Championship runner-up 2021–22
 Players' Player of the Season Guinness PRO14 2020–21
 Top try scorer United Rugby Championship 2020–21, 2021–22
 Selected in the United Rugby Championship "Dream Team"  2020–21, 2021–22

Springbok statistics

Test Match Record 

Pld = Games Played, W = Games Won, D = Games Drawn, L = Games Lost, Tri = Tries Scored, Con = Conversions, Pen = Penalties, DG = Drop Goals, Pts = Points Scored

International Tries

References

External links
 
Sharks Profile

1991 births
Living people
Afrikaner people
Blue Bulls players
Bulls (rugby union) players
Expatriate rugby union players in Northern Ireland
Mie Honda Heat players
Rugby union flankers
Rugby union players from Potchefstroom
Sharks (Currie Cup) players
Sharks (rugby union) players
South Africa international rugby union players
South African expatriate rugby union players
South African expatriate sportspeople in Northern Ireland
South African people of Dutch descent
South African rugby union players
Ulster Rugby players
Kobelco Kobe Steelers players
Expatriate rugby union players in Japan
South African expatriate sportspeople in Japan